Nigerian academic and the Provost of Federal College of Education, Katsina Nigeria.
Dr Aliyu Idris Funtua is a Nigerian academic and the Provost of Federal College of Education, Katsina. He became the 13th Provost of the College on August 19, 2016, after President Muhammadu Buhari approved his appointment. Prior to this appointment, he was the Deputy as well as the Acting Provost of the College. He holds a PhD in Hausa Language from Bayero University, Kano in 2016.

Funtua hails from Funtua Local Government in Katsina State. He is conferred a traditional title of Wakilin Malaman Katsina "Representative of Katsina State Scholars" by His Royal Highness, the Emir of Katsina, Abdulmumini Kabir Usman.

Born in Dandume local government in 1962, Dr. Funtua attended Aya Primary School in Funtua and Government Secondary School in Malumfashi local government. He went to Federal Advanced Teachers' College (now Federal College of Education, Katsina) where he got NCE in 1984. He obtained his first, second and third degrees from Bayero University Kano.

In 1985, Funtua started working as a classroom teacher under defunct Kaduna State. He became a lecturer in Federal College of Education, Katsina in 1997 and he held several positions.

He is married with children

References 

Living people
1960 births
Bayero University Kano alumni
Heads of universities and colleges in Africa